St. Mary of the Immaculate Conception Church, also known as St. Mary's of Morges) is a Roman Catholic church located in the unincorporated community of Morges in Rose Township, Carroll County, Ohio, United States.  A part of the Diocese of Steubenville, it was founded in 1834 and re-established in 1948; its current building was built in 1851 and renovated in 1979. The altar was crafted in Europe and shipped to the parish late in the 19th century. The stained-glass windows were donated by parishioners in the early 1900s. The 1979 restoration involved refinishing the altar, repainting statuary and walls, and installation of new pews.

The church is built of brick with a stone foundation. The bricks were manufactured on premises. In 1977, the church was listed on the National Register of Historic Places for its architectural significance, along with a related house on the same property.

References

External links
Historical markers in Carroll County

Roman Catholic churches completed in 1851
Churches on the National Register of Historic Places in Ohio
Buildings and structures in Carroll County, Ohio
National Register of Historic Places in Carroll County, Ohio
Churches in the Roman Catholic Diocese of Steubenville
19th-century Roman Catholic church buildings in the United States
1851 establishments in Ohio